Jean Piaget University may refer to:

Jean Piaget University of Angola 
Jean Piaget University of Cape Verde